Petre Locusteanu (1883 – March 1919) was a Romanian journalist and humorist.

He was born in Bucharest. At Flacăra, he was editor and drama columnist from 1911 to 1914, assisted by Ion Pillat. In 1916, he edited his own bimonthly magazine, Ziarul meu; from 1917 to 1918, in the temporary World War I national capital of Iași, he administered România newspaper. His first published work was the 1910 farce Nevasta lui Cerceluș. This was followed by brief biographies and humorous sketches, collected as Cincizeci figuri contimporane (1913) and Suntem nebuni (1914). He committed suicide in 1919.

Notes

1883 births
1919 suicides
Journalists from Bucharest
Romanian male stage actors
Romanian theatre critics
Romanian humorists
Romanian biographers
Romanian male writers
Male biographers
Romanian magazine editors
Romanian newspaper editors
Suicides in Romania
20th-century Romanian dramatists and playwrights
Male dramatists and playwrights
20th-century male writers